Belváros means "inner city", "city centre" or "downtown" in Hungarian. It is the name of the central part of most Hungarian cities. Here is a list of articles of city parts with this name:

Belváros (Budapest)
Downtown (Miskolc)